One Night in Paris – The Exciter Tour 2001 – A Live DVD by Anton Corbijn is a video release by Depeche Mode, featuring an entire concert from their 2001 Exciter Tour, shot at the Palais Omnisports de Paris-Bercy on 9 and 10 October 2001. Although the cover only lists the second date, material from the first was used, as "It Doesn't Matter Two" was only played on the 9th. That song was replaced by "Sister of Night" the next day (and included as a bonus track on disc 2). Many fans were disappointed to see the popular song "Clean" (a regular on the tour, played on the first night in Paris) not included (no live version is officially released of the song to this date), Condemnation (from the second night, rarely performed in 2001, with several live versions previously available) taking its place in the film. It was directed and filmed by Anton Corbijn, and released in 2002.

The first disc features the full concert, while the second disc contains documentaries on the movie, interviews with the band, extra songs, tour projections, and more.

Background
The DVD was directed by the band's long-time artistic collaborator Anton Corbijn at the sold-out Palais Omnisports de Paris Bercy in front of 16,000 people. The concert film was shot on anamorphic 16:9 Digital Betacam using 13 cameras.

DVD

UMD

VHS

Formats
 DVD – double-disc DVD release, DVD 1 containing 20 tracks with the Exciter Tour concert recorded between 9–10 October 2001, and DVD 2 containing 9 tracks (1 hidden), with the Making of the DVD.
 UMD Europe and USA – 1-disc UMD, entitled One Night in Paris – A Live Film by Anton Corbijn, containing 20 tracks with the Exciter Tour concert recorded between 9–10 October 2001.
 VHS Europe – Europe-only VHS release, entitled One Night in Paris – A Live Concert by Anton Corbijn, containing 20 tracks with the Exciter Tour concert recorded between 9–10 October 2001.

Cast

Depeche Mode
Dave Gahan – lead vocals
Martin Gore – guitar, keyboards, backing vocals, lead vocals on "It Doesn't Matter Two", "Breathe", "Home", "Sister of Night", and "Surrender"
Andy Fletcher – keyboards, backing vocals

Backup musicians
Christian Eigner – drums
Peter Gordeno – keyboards, piano, backing vocals
Jordan Bailey – backing vocals
Georgia Lewis – backing vocals

Charts

Certifications

References

External links
 

Depeche Mode video albums
2002 video albums
Live video albums
2002 live albums